Kodannur  is a village in Thrissur district in the state of Kerala, India.  It is almost 10 km from Thrissur city. This village include main three parts: 1. Chakkyarkadavu; 2. Thannikkyamunayam; 3. Sasthamkadavu. The Village is surrounded with paddy fields.

Demographics
According to the 2001 India census, Kodannur had a population of 6926 with 3345 males and 3581 females.

References

Villages in Thrissur district